Port Carbon is a borough of Schuylkill County, Pennsylvania, United States, located two miles (3 km) northeast of Pottsville. It is in a coal-mining area. In the past, ironworks had been a feature of the borough. In 1900, 2,168 people lived here and, in 1910, 2,678. The population was 1,815 at the 2020 census.

Geography
Port Carbon is located at  (40.697210, -76.166734).

Demographics

At the 2000 census, there were 2,019 people, 846 households and 577 families residing in the borough. The racial make-up was 99.11% White, 0.54% African American, 0.05% Native American, 0.05% Asian, 0.05% Pacific Islander, 0.05% from other races and 0.15% from two or more races. Hispanic or Latino of any race were 0.54% of the population.

There were 846 households, of which 25.9% had children under the age of 18 living with them, 48.9% were married couples living together, 13.2% had a female householder with no husband present, and 31.7% were non-families. 28.8% of all households were made up of individuals and 17.3% had someone living alone who was 65 years of age or older. The average household size was 2.38 and the average family size was 2.91.

20.5% of the population were under the age of 18, 7.8% from 18 to 24, 26.7% from 25 to 44, 24.3% from 45 to 64 and 20.7% were 65 years of age or older. The median age was 42 years. For every 100 females, there were 89.4 males. For every 100 females age 18 and over, there were 85.5 males.

The median household income was $30,875 and the median family income was $37,939. Males had a median income of $30,165 and females $20,872. The per capita income was $16,496. About 5.2% of families and 7.2% of the population were below the poverty line, including 8.4% of those under age 18 and 7.6% of those age 65 or over.

History

Port Carbon was founded by Abraham Pott, a son of John Pott who founded Pottsville in 1806.

Port Carbon was the site of the first lock on the Schuylkill Canal, on its route for transport of coal mined in the region to Philadelphia. Robert Allison, a local industrialist, purchased the first commercially manufactured automobile, a Winton.

Notable person
Peggy Maley, former actress

Gallery

References

Populated places on the Schuylkill River
Populated places established in 1826
Municipalities of the Anthracite Coal Region of Pennsylvania
Boroughs in Schuylkill County, Pennsylvania
1826 establishments in Pennsylvania